Wilayatul Hisbah is the Islamic religious police force responsible for the enforcement of sharia law in the autonomous region of Aceh, Indonesia. The origins of this force can be traced to 2001 when a special autonomy law was promulgated to allow for the state of Aceh to implement more elements of sharia law, which the Indonesian government saw as a useful way of decreasing local fervor for Acehnese independence. These officers have reportedly been patrolling streets since 2002, but the force was formally established in 2004, It was established at both the provincial level as well the district and municipality levels. The units were formed in response to an increase in "unmarried couples, Muslim women without headscarves or those wearing tight clothes, and people drinking alcohol or gambling,” which authorities perceived to have become more common following contact with Western ideas after foreign aid was provided after the 2004 Indonesian tsunami. It was described in a 2014 report as being a "voluntary" force.

The force's integrity has been questioned occasionally. Its public image deteriorated heavily in 2010 after three officials were found to have raped a girl that was being detained by them in West Aceh Regency. In another instance, an officer was found to be engaging in sex with his girlfriend in a Banda Aceh bathroom.

Organization Structure 
The latest constituting document of Wilayatul Hisbah, Governor of Aceh Decree No. 139/2016, structured the force as follow:

 Office of Head/Commander of Wilayatul Hisbah
 Secretariat.
 Bureau of General Affairs and Employment
 Bureau of Programs and Reporting
 Bureau of Finance
 Division of Regional Law Enforcement.
 Section of Investigation
 Section of Civil Apparatus Guidance and Fostering
 Section of Internal Prosecution
 Division of Public Order and Peace
 Section of Operation and Control
 Section of Public Order and Peace Guidance and Fostering
 Section of Regional Assets Security and Monitoring
 Division of Islamic Sharia Monitoring
 Section of Islamic Sharia Operation and Monitoring
 Section of Islamic Sharia Guidance and Extension
 Section of Reporting of Islamic Sharia Violations
 Division of Public Protection
 Section of Civil Defense Units Development
 Section of Public Potentials Guidance and Fostering
 Section of Readiness
 Division of Inter-institutional Relation
 Section of Institutional Development
 Section of Coordination and Partnership
 Section of Public Relation

Command and Coordination 
As apparatus of Aceh province, the commander of Wilayatul Hisbah reported to Governor of Aceh, but the institution consolidated and consulted to the Directorate General of Territorial Administration of the Ministry of Home Affairs.

Each city or regency in Aceh province possessed their own Wilayatul Hisbah office, but they are subordinate to their respective city or regency local government. Provincial Wilayatul Hisbah possessed power to held guidance and fostering to the Wilayatul Hisbah office in city or regency.

The Wilayatul Hisbah is separated and differed from another department in Aceh Province, Aceh Province Department of Islamic Sharia, which is tasked to educate, foster, conserve Islamic ways and way of life in Aceh, and performing research and assessments for producing Islamic law documents applicable in Aceh Province. While Aceh Department of Islamic Sharia tasked with such tasks, it does not have power for law enforcing. The Wilayatul Hisbah enforced the laws applicable within the province only.

References

Law enforcement in Indonesia
Culture of Aceh
Islamic religious police